Nim Wan was a bay between Tsang Tsui and Ha Pak Nai in Tuen Mun District, New Territories, Hong Kong. It approaches Deep Bay with Shekou, Shenzhen at its opposite.

The bay was reclaimed to become a landfill site, "West New Territories Landfill". The landfill site covers the area of 110 hectares. It can handle more than 6,500 tonnes of waste per day and is expected to be used for 25 years.

Nim Wan is a recognized village under the New Territories Small House Policy.

Education
Nim Wan is in Primary One Admission (POA) School Net 72. Within the school net are multiple aided schools (operated independently but funded with government money) and one government school: Tin Shui Wai Government Primary School (天水圍官立小學).

See also
 Waste management in Hong Kong
 Tuen Mun Rural Committee

References

External links

 Delineation of area of existing village Nim Wan (Tuen Mun) for election of resident representative (2019 to 2022)

Bays of Hong Kong
Tuen Mun District